The Emirate of Córdoba or Umayyad Emirate of Córdoba was a medieval Islamic kingdom in the Iberian Peninsula.

The territories of the emirate in southern Iberia, located in what the Arabs called al-Andalus, had formed part of the Umayyad Caliphate since the early 8th century CE. After the caliphate was overthrown by the Abbasid Revolution in 750, the Umayyad prince Abd ar-Rahman I fled the former capital of Damascus and established an independent emirate in southern Iberia in 756.

The provincial capital of Córdoba was made the capital, and within decades grew into one of the largest and most prosperous cities in the Mediterranean Region. After initially recognizing the legitimacy of the Abbasid caliph in Baghdad, in 929 emir Abd al-Rahman III declared the independence of the Caliphate of Córdoba, proclaiming himself as caliph.

History

Roderic was the Visigothic king who ruled Hispania, later referred to by the Arabs as al-Andalus, from 710 to 712 CE. The Umayyad Caliphate had previously conducted small raids on the southern tip of Iberia against the Visigoths, but full-scale conquest did not begin until April of 711, when an army led by Tariq ibn Ziyad crossed the narrow channel that separated southern Hispania from North Africa; the area is today known as Gibraltar, from the Arabic , meaning "mountain of Ṭāriq".

After crossing into Hispania, Tariq's troops clashed with Roderic's army at the banks of the Loukkos River. Visigothic forces were defeated, and Roderic was killed, leaving an open path into Hispania, and by extension, Western Europe. After the Umayyad conquest of Hispania in 711–718, the Iberian Peninsula was established as a province (wilāya) of the Umayyad Caliphate. The rulers of this province established their capital in Córdoba and received the administrative titles wāli or emīr.

In 756, Abd al-Rahman I, a prince of the deposed Umayyad royal family, refused to recognize the authority of the Abbasid Caliphate and became an independent emir of Córdoba. He had been on the run for six years after the Umayyads had lost the position of caliph in Damascus in 750 to the Abbasids. Intent on regaining a position of power, he defeated the existing Muslim rulers of the area who had defied Umayyad rule and united various local fiefdoms into an independent emirate. However, this first unification of al-Andalus (including Toledo, Zaragoza, Pamplona, and Barcelona) under Abd al-Rahman still took more than twenty-five years to complete.

For the next century and a half, his descendants continued as emirs of Córdoba, with nominal control over the rest of al-Andalus and sometimes even parts of western Maghreb, but with real control always in question, particularly over the marches along the Christian border, their power vacillating depending on the competence of the individual emir. For example, the power of emir Abdullah ibn Muhammad al-Umawi did not extend beyond Córdoba itself.

Upon the ascent to the throne of Abd al-Rahman III, in 912, the political decline of the emirate was obvious. Abd al-Rahman III rapidly restored Umayyad power throughout al-Andalus and extended it into western North Africa as well. In 929, to impose his authority and end the riots and conflicts that ravaged the Iberian peninsula, he proclaimed himself caliph of Córdoba, elevating the emirate to a position of prestige not only in comparison to the Abbasid caliph in Baghdad but also the Shiʿite Fatimid caliph in Tunis, with whom he was competing for control of North Africa. The Emirate of Córdoba gradually lost power and in 1492, Granada was taken by the Christians, and Muslim influence dissolved.

Culture 
Al-Andalus was subject to eastern cultural influences, with Abd ar-Rahman I likely having an interest in Syrian culture. During the reign of Abd al-Rahman II the culture of Baghdad became fashionable, and his reign is considered a high point of culture and patronage during the Emirate period. The emir sent emissaries to the Abbasid and Byzantine courts to bring back books on subjects such as Islamic religious scholarship, Arabic grammar, poetry, astrology, medicine, and other sciences. Abbas ibn Firnas was among the most notable poets and polymaths of this period who brought back technical and scientific knowledge back with him from the east. In high society, both men and women were expected to learn adab, a kind of etiquette common to al-Andalus and other Islamic societies at the time. Women, such as royal concubines, were sometimes sent abroad to be trained in adab and other forms of culture. The musician Ziryab was a "major trendsetter of his time" creating trends in fashion, hairstyles, and hygiene. His students took these trends with them throughout Europe and North Africa. He also founded an academy for arts, music, and fashion which lasted for several generations. Abd ar-Rahman II also established a workshop that produced official embroidered textiles known as tiraz, a custom that also existed in the east.

Architecture 

Upon rising to power, Abd ar-Rahman I initially resided in several palace-villas on the outskirts of Cordoba, most notably one called ar-Ruṣāfa. Ar-Ruṣāfa may have originally been a Roman villa or a Roman-Visigothic estate which was taken over and adapted by a Berber chieftain named Razin al-Burnusi who accompanied the original Muslim invasion by Tariq ibn Ziyad earlier that century. After a failed plot against him in 784, Abd ar-Rahman I moved his residence definitively to the site of the Alcázar in the city. He and his successors built and continuously developed the Alcázar into the official royal residence and seat of power in Al-Andalus. Abd ar-Rahman II was responsible for improving the water supply for both the city and the palace gardens. He may have also built the Albolafia and other norias (waterwheels) along the Guadalquivir River. (Although the Albolafia is also attributed by historians to either the 10th century or to the 12th century under the Almoravids.)

In 785 Abd ar-Rahman I founded the Great Mosque of Cordoba, one of the most important monuments of the architecture of the western Islamic world. The mosque was notable for its vast hypostyle hall composed of rows of columns connected by double tiers of arches (including horseshoe arches on the lower tier) composed of alternating red brick and light-colored stone. The mosque was subsequently expanded by Abd ar-Rahman II in 836, who preserved the original design while extending its dimensions. The mosque was again embellished with new features by his successors Muhammad, Al-Mundhir, and Abdallah. One of the western gates of the mosque, known as Bab al-Wuzara''' (today known as Puerta de San Esteban), dates from this period and is often noted as an important prototype of later Moorish architectural forms and motifs.

The palaces and the Great Mosque in Cordoba were linked via a high covered passage (sabbat) which was raised over the street between them, allowing the caliph direct access to the maqsurah area of the mosque via a corridor behind the qibla wall. The first sabbat was built by the Umayyad emir Abdallah (reigned 888-912) for security reasons and was later replaced by al-Hakam II when the latter expanded the mosque.

The original Great Mosque of Seville was either built or enlarged by Abd ar-Rahman II circa 830. It is now occupied by the Collegiate Church of the Divine Savior (Iglesia Colegial del Salvador''), which preserves only minor remains of the mosque. In Mérida, following a violent revolt, Abd ar-Rahman II also built a fortress, now known Alcazaba of Mérida, which was later re-used by the Knights of Santiago and remains standing today.

List of Rulers 
 Abd ar-Rahman I, 756–788
 Hisham I, 788–796
 al-Hakam I, 796–822
 Abd ar-Rahman II, 822–852
 Muhammad I, 852–886
 al-Mundhir, 886–888
 Abdallah ibn Muhammad, 888–912
 Abd ar-Rahman III, 912–929

See also 
 Reconquista
 Sara al-Qutiyya

Notes

References 

 
Córdoba
Former Muslim countries in Europe
Former Arab states
8th century in Al-Andalus
9th century in Al-Andalus
10th century in Al-Andalus
States and territories established in the 750s
8th-century establishments in Spain
929 disestablishments
10th-century disestablishments in Spain
756 establishments
Former countries in Spanish history